Richard Epcar is an American voice actor, voice director, and writer who has voiced over 1,200 characters in animation, video games and anime. Some of his major roles include Raiden in the Mortal Kombat franchise, The Joker in several projects (including Mortal Kombat vs DC Universe, Injustice: Gods Among Us, Injustice 2 and Mortal Kombat 11), Zangetsu in Bleach, Bobobo-bo Bo-bobo in Bobobo-bo Bo-bobo, Etemon and Myotismon in Digimon, Batou in Ghost in the Shell, Xehanort/Ansem in Kingdom Hearts, Joseph Joestar in JoJo's Bizarre Adventure: Stardust Crusaders and JoJo's Bizarre Adventure: Diamond is Unbreakable, Black Ghost/Skull in Cyborg 009, Akuma in Street Fighter V (replacing Dave Mallow), Daisuke Jigen in Lupin the Third and Andrall in Gormiti Nature Unleashed. He and fellow voice actress Ellyn Stern own and operate Epcar Entertainment, a voice-over production service company based in Los Angeles.

Filmography

Anime

Other Animation

Film

Video games

Live action

 Adventures in Voice Acting – Himself
 Big Bad Beetleborgs – Karato (as Richard George)
 Beetleborgs Metallix – Lightningborg (as Richard George)
 ER – Many Voices
 Gilmore Girls – Many Voices
 Glory Daze – Announcer
 Hercules – Many Voices
 JAG – Many Voices
 Masked Rider – Beetletron, Masked Rider Z-Cross/Masked Rider V-3 (as Richard George)
 Mighty Med- Mr. Terror (Voice only)
 Mighty Morphin Power Rangers – Shellshock, Mutitus, Babe Ruthless, Cyclops, Samurai Fan Man, Goatan (Lion voice), Primator (Zedd's Monster Mash), Invenusable Flytrap (Rangers Back in Time and The Wedding), Rhinoblaster (Football Season, The Wedding and Master Vile and the Metallic Armor), Miss Chief (2nd voice), Brick Bully (all uncredited roles)
 Power Rangers: Zeo – Bucket of Bolts, Defoliator, Autochthon, Protectron (all uncredited)
 Power Rangers: Turbo – Blazinator (uncredited)
 Power Rangers: In Space – Vacsacker (uncredited)
 Power Rangers: Wild Force – Bowling Org
 Xena – Many Voices
 VR Troopers – Col. Icebot, Slashbot, Dice Swordbot (2nd voice), Slice Swordbot (3rd voice), Frogbot, Cannonbot, Dark Heart, Chrome Dome, Graybot (with Zelton as him) (as Richard George)

References

External links
 
 
 
 

Living people
20th-century American male actors
21st-century American male actors
American casting directors
American male film actors
American male television actors
American male television writers
American male video game actors
American male voice actors
American television writers
American voice directors
Male actors from Los Angeles
Screenwriters from Arizona
Screenwriters from California
University of Arizona alumni
Writers from Los Angeles
Year of birth missing (living people)